The Fourteenth Canadian Ministry was the second cabinet chaired by Prime Minister William Lyon Mackenzie King.  It governed Canada from 25 September 1926 to 7 August 1930, including only the 16th Canadian Parliament.  The government was formed by the Liberal Party of Canada.  Mackenzie King was also Prime Minister in the Twelfth and Sixteenth Canadian Ministries.

Ministers
Prime Minister
25 September 1926 – 7 August 1930: William Lyon Mackenzie King
Minister of Agriculture
25 September 1926 – 7 August 1930: William Richard Motherwell
Minister of Customs and Excise
25 September 1926 – 31 March 1927: William Daum Euler
Secretary of State for External Affairs
25 September 1926 – 7 August 1930: William Lyon Mackenzie King
Minister of Finance
25 September 1926 – 12 November 1929: James Robb
12 November 1929 – 26 November 1929: Vacant (John C. Saunders was acting)
26 November 1929 – 7 August 1930: Charles Avery Dunning
Receiver General of Canada
25 September 1926 – 7 August 1930: The Minister of Finance (Ex officio)
25 September 1926 – 12 November 1929: James Robb
12 November 1929 – 26 November 1929: Vacant (John C. Saunders was acting)
26 November 1929 – 7 August 1930: Charles Avery Dunning
Minister of Fisheries
14 June 1930 – 17 June 1930: Vacant (William Ambrose Found was acting)
17 June 1930 – 7 August 1930: Cyrus Macmillan
Minister presiding over the Department of Health
25 September 1926 – 11 June 1928: James Horace King
Minister of Immigration and Colonization
25 September 1926 – 30 December 1930: Robert Forke
30 December 1930 – 27 June 1930: Charles Stewart (acting)
27 June 1930 – 7 August 1930: Ian Alistair Mackenzie
Superintendent-General of Indian Affairs
25 September 1926 – 19 June 1930: Charles Stewart
19 June 1930 – 27 June 1930: Charles Stewart (acting)
27 June 1930 – 7 August 1930: Ian Alistair Mackenzie
Minister of the Interior
25 September 1926 – 7 August 1930: Charles Stewart
Minister of Justice
25 September 1926 – 7 August 1930: Ernest Lapointe
Attorney General of Canada
25 September 1926 – 7 August 1930: The Minister of Justice (Ex officio)
25 September 1926 – 7 August 1930: Ernest Lapointe
Minister of Labour
25 September 1926 – 7 August 1930: Peter Heenan
Leader of the Government in the Senate
25 September 1926 – 7 August 1930: Raoul Dandurand
Minister of Marine
14 June 1930 – 7 August 1930: Pierre Joseph Arthur Cardin
Minister of Marine and Fisheries
25 September 1926 – 14 June 1930: Pierre Joseph Arthur Cardin
Minister of Mines
25 September 1926 – 7 August 1930: Charles Stewart
Minister of National Defence
25 September 1926 – 1 October 1926: Vacant (George Joseph Desbarats was acting)
1 October 1926 – 8 October 1926: James Robb (acting)
8 October 1926 – 7 August 1930: James Ralston
Minister of National Revenue
31 March 1927 – 7 August 1930: William Daum Euler
Minister of Pensions and National Health
11 June 1928 – 19 June 1930: James Horace King
19 June 1930 – 7 August 1930: James Ralston
Postmaster General
25 September 1926 – 7 August 1930: Peter Veniot
President of the Privy Council
25 September 1926 – 7 August 1930: William Lyon Mackenzie King
Minister of Public Works
25 September 1926 – 7 August 1930: John Campbell Elliott
Minister of Railways and Canals 
25 September 1926 – 26 November 1929: Charles Avery Dunning
26 November 1929 – 30 December 1929: Charles Avery Dunning (acting)
30 December 1929 – 7 August 1930: Thomas Crerar
Secretary of State of Canada
25 September 1926 – 7 August 1930: Fernand Rinfret
Registrar General of Canada
25 September 1926 – 7 August 1930: The Secretary of State of Canada (Ex officio)
25 September 1926 – 7 August 1930: Fernand Rinfret
Minister of Soldiers' Civil Re-establishment
25 September 1926 – 11 June 1928: James Horace King
Solicitor General of Canada
25 September 1926 – 7 August 1930: Lucien Cannon
Minister of Trade and Commerce
25 September 1926 – 7 August 1930: James Malcolm
Minister without Portfolio
25 September 1926 – 7 August 1930: Raoul Dandurand
17 June 1930 – 7 August 1930: William Frederic Kay

Offices not of the Cabinet
Parliamentary Secretary of Soldiers' Civil Re-establishment
25 September 1926 – 11 June 1928: Vacant

References

Succession

14
1926 establishments in Canada
1930 disestablishments in Canada
Cabinets established in 1926
Cabinets disestablished in 1930
Ministries of George V